The 2018–19 Morehead State Eagles men's basketball team represented Morehead State University during the 2018–19 NCAA Division I men's basketball season. The Eagles, led by second-year head coach Preston Spradlin, played their home games at Ellis Johnson Arena in Morehead, Kentucky as members of the Ohio Valley Conference. They finished the season 13–20, 8–10 in OVC play to finish in fifth place. They defeated SIU Edwardsville in the first round of the OVC tournament before losing in the quarterfinals to Austin Peay.

Previous season 
The Eagles finished the 2017–18 season 8–21, 4–14 in OVC play to finish in last place. They failed to qualify for the OVC tournament.

Roster

Schedule and results

|-
!colspan=9 style=| Exhibition

|-
!colspan=9 style=| Non-conference regular season

|-
!colspan=9 style=| Ohio Valley Conference regular season

|-
!colspan=9 style=|Ohio Valley tournament

Source

References

Morehead State Eagles men's basketball seasons
Morehead State
Morehead State
Morehead State